Vestbygda, Vestbygd, or Vestbygdi are place names in the Norwegian language.  The prefix "vest-" means "western" and the root word "bygd(a/i)" refers to a "village" or "rural countryside".  The name may refer to the following places in Norway:

Places
Vestbygda or Jørstad, a village in Snåsa municipality, Trøndelag county, Norway
Vestbygd, Agder, a village in Farsund municipality, Agder county, Norway
Vestbygda, Nordland, a village in Lødingen municipality, Nordland county, Norway
Vestbygdi, Osterøy, a village in Osterøy municipality, Vestland county, Norway
Vestbygda, Ringerike, a village in Ringerike municipality, Innlandet county, Norway
Vestbygdi, Voss, a village in Voss municipality, Vestland county, Norway
Vestbygda, Østre Toten, a village in Østre Toten municipality, Innlandet county, Norway

See also
Nordbygda (disambiguation)
Austbygda (disambiguation)
Sørbygda (disambiguation)